Silene sorensenis, the three-flowered campion or Sorensen's catchfly, is a species of plant in the family Caryophyllaceae. It is found in the tundra of the Canadian Arctic Archipelago, the Northern Russian Far East and Greenland.

This species was named after Danish botanist Thorvald Sørensen (1902–1973).

References

External links

sorensenis
Flora of Greenland
Flora of the Northwest Territories
Flora of Nunavut
Flora of the Russian Far East